Sées is a commune in the Orne department in north-western France.

Sées station has rail connections to Argentan, Caen and Le Mans.

Name
The town's name derives from the Latin (civitas) Sagiensis "city of the Sagii", a Gaulish tribe that turned it into its capital city. The traditional spelling was Séez, which has been retained by the Church; the Diocese of Séez is headed by the Bishop of Séez. However, the spelling Sées was adopted for the town by the civil authorities following Napoleon's successful Italian campaign of 1796–7, one result of which was to bring another (Savoyan) Séez into France.

History
The first bishop of Sées was St Lain, who lived about the fourth century. In the ninth century, Sées was a fortified town and fell prey to the Normans. At that period Sées had two distinct parts: the Orne: the bishop's borough to the north and the new count's borough (Bourg le Comte) to the south. The counts of Alençon took control in 1356. It was captured and recaptured in the wars between Henry II of England and his sons. In the Hundred Years' War it was one of the first towns of Normandy to fall into the hands of the English, in 1418. Pillaged by the Protestants during the Wars of Religion, Sées attached itself to the Catholic League in 1589, but voluntarily surrendered to Henry IV of France in 1590.

Heraldry

Sights
The town is an episcopal see and has a Gothic cathedral of remarkably bold architecture. The cathedral dates from the 13th and 14th centuries and occupies the site of three earlier churches. The nave was built towards the end of the 13th century. The choir, built soon afterwards, is remarkable for the lightness of its construction. In the choir are four bas-reliefs of great beauty representing scenes in the life of the Virgin Mary; and the altar is adorned with another depicting the removal of the relics of St. Gervais and St. Protais. The church has been the object of frequent restoration and reconstruction.

Other noteworthy buildings are the episcopal palace (1778), with a pretty chapel; the higher seminary, located in the old abbey of St. Martin, supposed to be one of the 14 or 15 monasteries founded in the sixth century by St. Evroult; and the sumptuous modern chapel of the Immaculate Conception, a resort of pilgrims.

See also
Communes of the Orne department
Parc naturel régional Normandie-Maine

References

Communes of Orne
Gallia Lugdunensis